Stephen Holden (born July 18, 1941) is an American writer, poet, and music and film critic.

Biography
Holden earned a Bachelor of Arts degree in English from Yale University in 1963. He worked as a photo editor, staff writer, and eventually became an A&R executive for RCA Records before turning to writing pop music reviews and related articles for Rolling Stone magazine, Blender, The Village Voice, The Atlantic, and Vanity Fair, among other publications. He first achieved prominence with his 1970s Rolling Stone work, where he tended to cover singer-songwriter and traditional pop artists. He joined the staff of The New York Times in 1981, and subsequently became one of the newspaper's leading theatre and film critics.

Holden's experiences as a journalist and executive with RCA led him to write the satirical novel Triple Platinum, which was published by Dell Books in 1980. He is the recipient of the 1986 Grammy Award for Best Album Notes for The Voice: The Columbia Years, a Frank Sinatra anthology. His poetry has been featured in The New Yorker and is included in the anthology The New Yorker Book of Poems.

In the mid-1990s, Holden became a second-string film critic, moving into the role of first-string movie critic by year 2000.

Holden has appeared on 60 Minutes, 20/20, and Entertainment Tonight, and has provided commentaries on National Public Radio.

See also
New Yorkers in journalism

References

External links

Recent and archived New York Times articles

1941 births
Living people
American music critics
American music journalists
American film critics
Grammy Award winners
Critics employed by The New York Times
American male poets
20th-century American poets
Yale University alumni
Place of birth missing (living people)
Rolling Stone people
The Village Voice people
The Atlantic (magazine) people
Vanity Fair (magazine) people
20th-century American male writers
20th-century American non-fiction writers
American male non-fiction writers